Tasarkhay (Taharkhai) is a rural locality (a selo) in Dzhidinsky District, Republic of Buryatia, Russia. The population was 136 as of 2010. There are 15 streets.

Geography 
Tasarkhay is located 24 km southeast of Petropavlovka (the district's administrative centre) by road. Dodo-Ichyotuy is the nearest rural locality.

References 

Rural localities in Dzhidinsky District